The 1991 CART PPG Indy Car World Series season was the 13th national championship season of American open wheel racing sanctioned by CART. The season consisted of 17 races, and one non-points exhibition event. Michael Andretti was the national champion, and the rookie of the year was his younger brother Jeff Andretti.

The 1991 Indianapolis 500 was sanctioned by USAC, but counted towards the CART points championship. Rick Mears won the Indy 500, his record-tying fourth victory in the event.

Michael Andretti won a total of eight races, eight pole positions, and led more than half of the laps during the season, but the championship battle still went down to the final race of the season. Bobby Rahal won only one race, but had 11 podium finishes and 13 top tens. Rahal's consistent season put him in position to challenge Andretti for the title in the season finale at Laguna Seca. Andretti got off to a slow start to the season, dropping out of the first two races, and finished a heartbreaking second at Indianapolis. But after Indy, he shot to the top of the standings. He won four of the last five races of the season, and needed to finish 6th or better at Laguna Seca to clinch the title. When Bobby Rahal dropped out at Laguna Seca with overheating problems, Andretti cruised to the title.

Drivers and constructors 
The following teams and drivers competed for the 1991 Indy Car World Series. All entrants used Goodyear tires.

Season Summary

Schedule

 Oval/Speedway
 Dedicated road course
 Temporary street circuit
NC Non-championship event
Indianapolis was USAC-sanctioned but counted towards the PPG Indy Car title.

Race results

Final driver standings

Nation's Cup

 Top result per race counts towards Nation's Cup.

Chassis Constructor's Cup

Engine Manufacturer's Cup

References

See also
 1991 Indianapolis 500
 1991 Toyota Atlantic Championship season
 1991 Indy Lights season

Champ Car seasons
IndyCar